Kazanchi (Qaźansı) is a rural locality (a selo) in Starokosteyevsky Selsoviet, Bakalinsky District, Bashkortostan, Russia. The population was 327 as of 2010. There are 4 streets.

Geography 
Kazanchi is located 22 km west of Bakaly (the district's administrative centre) by road. Galiullinka is the nearest rural locality.

References 

Rural localities in Bakalinsky District